Trudy Krisher (born 1946) is an American author of young adult novels, children's books, a college textbook, and a scholarly biography. She is a former professor of liberal arts in Dayton, Ohio.

Early life and education 
Krisher was born in Macon, Georgia. Her parents were Whitley Herron Butner and Lois Drane Butner. She graduated from The College of William and Mary in 1968 and received a master's in education from Trenton State College in 1972.

Career 
Krisher has written young adult novels, children’s picture books, a college textbook, and a scholarly biography.

From 2001 until her retirement Krisher was a professor in the Department of Liberal Arts, Communication, and Social Sciences at Sinclair Community College. She was an assistant professor at University of Dayton from 1985 to 2001.

'Spite Fences'(1994)'Kinship (1997), Uncommon Faith (2003), Fallout (2006), and Bark Park (2018) were reviewed by Kirkus. 'Spite Fences' was reviewed by Publishers Weekly and School Library Journal. 'Uncommon Faith was reviewed by Publishers Weekly.

Awards and honors
 1994 Cuffie Award for Most Promising New Author, Publishers Weekly
 1994 Miami Valley Cultural Alliance Arts Award
 1994 Honor Book selection, Parents' Choice, and Best Book for Young Adults selection, American Library Association
 1995 Best Young Adult Novel award, International Reading Association
 1995 Jefferson Cup Honor Book, Virginia Library Association
 1995 New York Public Library Award
 1997 Best Books Award, American Library Association
 1997 New York Library Award
 1999 Tennessee Volunteer State Book Award, Tennessee Association of School Librarians
 2004 Best Books Award, American Library Association
 2004 Best Children's Book of the Year, Bank Street College of Education
 2004 Amelia Bloomer Project honors, City of Austin Youth Services
 2004 Culture Works Artists' fellowship
2015 Silver Medal, Independent Publishers Association
2018 Ohioana Award for BARK PARK (Simon & Schuster/Beach Lane Books)
2018 Angie Karcher Best-in-Rhyme Award

Bibliography
Kathy's Hats: A Story of Hope (1992)
Spite Fences (1994)
Writing for a Reader: Peers, Process, and Progress in the Writing Classroom (1994)
Kinship (1997)
Uncommon Faith (2003)
Fallout (2006)
Fanny Seward: a Life
An Affectionate Farewell: Old Bob and Old Abe (2015)
Bark Park (2018)
ON THE MARCH: A NOVEL OF THE WOMEN'S MARCH ON WASHINGTON; The Social Justice Press, 2022.

Personal life 
Krisher has three children. She is a Unitarian and a Democrat. She lives in Columbus, Ohio.

References

Further reading 
Booklist, October 1, 1992, Ilene Cooper, review of Kathy's Hats: A Story of Hope, p. 336; December 1, 1994, Frances Bradburn, review of Spite Fences, p. 666; November 15, 2006, Gillian Engberg, review of Fallout, p. 40.
Kirkus Reviews, September 1, 1992. review of Kathy's Hats; December 15, 1994, review of Spite Fences; September 15, 2006, review of Fallout, p. 958.
Publishers Weekly, November 14, 1994, review of Spite Fences, p. 70; December 11, 2006, review of Fallout, p. 71.
School Library Journal, November, 1994, Margaret Cole, review of Spite Fences, p. 121; October, 2003, Kathleen Isaacs, review of Uncommon Faith, p. 169; November, 2006, Pat Scales, review of Fallout, p. 139.
Voice of Youth Advocates, October, 1994, review of Spite Fences, p. 209.

1946 births
Living people
American women writers
College of William & Mary alumni
University of Dayton faculty
The College of New Jersey alumni
Writers from Macon, Georgia
Writers from Dayton, Ohio